Amos Allen (born July 20, 1983) is a former running back in the Canadian Football League. He was signed by the BC Lions as a street free agent in 2008. He played college football for the South Dakota Coyotes. He became an NFL Draft pick in 2008. He also spent a portion of the 2009 CFL season with the Toronto Argonauts. Allen played five regular season games returning punts and kicks for the Argonauts in 2009. On June 5, 2010, Allen was released by the Argonauts.

References

External links
Just Sports Stats
Toronto Argonauts bio
Lions bio

1983 births
Living people
American football running backs
Canadian football running backs
South Dakota Coyotes football players
BC Lions players
Toronto Argonauts players
Players of American football from Miami
Players of Canadian football from Miami